was a Japanese noble, the son of Fujiwara no Moromichi and the grandson of Fujiwara no Morozane. He was the father of Fujiwara no Tadamichi. He built a villa, Fukedono, north of the Byōdō-in Temple in 1114.

Marriage and children
 Minamoto Ninshi
 daughter
 son
 Minamoto Zishi
 Fujiwara no Yasuko (1095-1156) married Emperor Toba
 Fujiwara no Tadamichi
 daughter of Fujiwara Morizane
 Fujiwara no Yorinaga
 Harima
 unknown
 Daughter (d.1142)

References 

Sesshō and Kampaku
Regents of Japan
Fujiwara clan
1078 births
1162 deaths